There have been various proposals for constitutional reform in the United Kingdom.

Current system 
The United Kingdom of Great Britain and Northern Ireland is a constitutional monarchy governed via a Westminster system of parliamentary democracy. It comprises the four constituent parts of England, Scotland, Wales and Northern Ireland. 

The UK operates a system of devolution from a central UK parliament and prime minister as head of government, to the devolved legislatures of the Scottish Parliament, Senedd  and Northern Ireland Assembly with their respective first ministers. In England, Greater London, combined authorities, and the counties of Cornwall and Yorkshire, have varying degrees of devolved powers. There are proposals for a England-wide or regional devolution.

The constitution of the United Kingdom is an uncodified constitution. There are two chambers of the UK parliament: the House of Commons and House of Lords. The UK has various overseas territories and crown dependencies, and is composed of three legal jurisdictions.

Proposed reforms

Dissolution 
 Independence of Wales and Scotland and the unification of Ireland.
 Confederation of separate sovereign states.

National governance 

 Increase in devolved powers to the constituent countries of the UK such as proposed further Welsh devolution and Scottish devolution.
 Adopt a federal system of governance between the countries of England, Wales, Scotland and Northern Ireland.

Parliamentary reform 
 Reforming the House of Lords; through either modification of the appointment process, reducing the number of Lords, removing the Lords Spiritual, or abolition.
 A "Senate of Nations" to replace the House of Lords.
 Parliament of the United Kingdom relocation
 House of Lords relocation

Electoral reform 
 Electoral reform, such as by replacing the first-past-the-post voting system with proportional representation and/or lowering the voting age to 16.

Constitution codification 
 Codification of the UK constitution.

Reform of monarchy 
 Reform of the monarchy, which includes abolishing the monarchy. Abolishment of the monarchy is advocated by republicanism in the UK.

Religious reform 
 Ending the Church of England's status as the official church of the United Kingdom, known as disestablishment of the Church, which would make the UK a non-religious, secular state.

Human rights legislation 

 The Bill of Rights Bill is a proposal to replace the Human Rights Act 1998.

See also 
 Commonwealth of Britain Bill
 History of the constitution of the United Kingdom

References 

Constitution of the United Kingdom
Reform in the United Kingdom
Politics of the United Kingdom
Law of the United Kingdom
Government of the United Kingdom